The Ramna Stacks are a group of skerries in the Shetland islands. They are north of the northern tip of Mainland, and along with nearby Gruney they are a special protection area on account of their birdlife.

From north to south they consist of:
Gaut Skerries
Outer Stack
Scordar
Turla
Speolk
Hyter (formerly Driter)
Stab
Ofoora
Fladda (which has a natural arch and two caves)
Flae-ass
Barlcudda

Gruney and the islet of The Club lie just to the south of the Ramna Stacks.

See also

 List of islands of Scotland
 List of Special Protection Areas in Scotland
 List of Shetland islands

References

External links 
 Site with map

Uninhabited islands of Shetland
Stacks of Scotland
Skerries of Scotland
Underwater diving sites in Scotland
Natural arches of Scotland
Northmavine